S. M. McKibben House is an historic residence, now office building, located in Muscatine, Iowa, United States. It has been listed on the National Register of Historic Places since 1974.

History
Samuel N. McKibben was a native of Pennsylvania who moved to Iowa sometime before 1856.  Successful in business he had this double house built for his family between 1866 and 1869.  Over his years in Muscatine, he was a lumber merchant, saloon operator, cultivator manufacturing and merchandising groceries, provisions, and the like.   The house is one of the few early structures that remain in the oldest residential section of town. It has been re-purposed to house a local Insurance Agency.

Architecture 
The exterior of the double house is composed of red brick laid in common bond with headers every eighth course. The main facade features a symmetrical arrangement of openings. A major renovation of the house was undertaken in 1964. The original porches, front doors, and windows were removed.

References

Houses completed in 1869
Federal architecture in Iowa
Buildings and structures in Muscatine, Iowa
Houses in Muscatine County, Iowa
National Register of Historic Places in Muscatine County, Iowa
Houses on the National Register of Historic Places in Iowa